Victor E. Dandré or D'André (1870–1944) was a Russian-born, Duma official who left Russia and became the husband of the world renowned ballerina, Anna Pavlova and a ballet impresario.

Life

Victor Emmanuel Dandré was born in the Russian Empire in 1870, despite bearing a French name. He was descended from the French aristocratic Dandré family, who had settled in Imperial Russia after the French revolution along with other French families. He was regarded as a French-Russian aristocrat, who had spent his early life mainly in Paris and St Petersburg. He was well educated and spoke four languages fluently. Before meeting Pavlova he was speaker and whip in the Russian Senate. 
 
He met Anna Pavlova in Paris in 1904 (some sources say 1900) and very soon became her manager. They married secretly in 1914. Their main residence from around 1912 was Ivy House in Golders Green, since 1930s a predominantly Jewish area of London. They ran a dance school from the house. Under his management, Pavlova's ballet troupe grew from six to sixty.

Following Pavlova's death in 1931 he continued to be involved in ballet and toured the world with groups of Russians. From 1938 he managed Colonel Wassily de Basil's Ballets Russes, later renaming them the Royal Covent Garden Russian Ballet Company.

He died in London on 5 February 1944. He was cremated at Golders Green Crematorium and his ashes were placed beneath those of Anna Pavlova in the columbarium.

Publications

"Anna Pavlova in Time" (1931)
"Anna Pavlova in Art and Life" (1932)

References

1870 births
1944 deaths
Ballet impresarios
Emigrants from the Russian Empire to the United Kingdom
Politicians from Saint Petersburg
Russian ballet